Erythrina humeana, commonly known as the dwarf coral tree, dwarf erythrina or Natal coral tree, is an ornamental tree native to South Africa.

Gallery

External links
Plants For A Future: Erythrina humeana  
USDA Plants Profile: Erythrina humeana

humeana
Trees of South Africa
Garden plants of Africa
Ornamental trees